Two Guitars One Passion is the second album released by the flamenco-influenced Latin guitar duo Lara & Reyes.

Track listing
"Atardecer (Dusk)"
"Juego (Game)"
"Seguidilla from 'Carmen Suite'"
"Dia De Fiesta (Holiday)"
"Baghdad"
"Obsidiana"
"Spain"
"Camino A Paracho (Road To Paracho)"
"La Bikina"
"Luna Y Estrellas (Moon & Stars)"

References

1996 albums
Lara & Reyes albums
Higher Octave albums